Dana (IV) is the primary Danish research vessel. It entered service in 1981, where it replaced the research vessel Dana (III). Originally built for the Danish Fisheries and Marine Research, but transferred to the National Institute for Aquatic Resources under the Danish Technical University in 2007.

The ship is rigged as a deep sea stern trawler and fully equipped with facilities for fisheries and hydrographical research. Primary areas of operation are the Baltic Sea, North Sea and Greenland.

It is expected to remain in active service until replaced by a new research vessel, Dana (V), in 2025.

References 

Research vessels of Denmark
Ships built in Denmark
1980 ships